The Yudong Bridge is a prestressed concrete box girder bridge which crosses the Yangtze River in Chongqing, China. The bridge carries 6 lanes of China National Highway 210 between the Banan District south of the Yangtze River and the Dadukou District to the north. The bridge also carries Line 2 of the Chongqing Metro in its median.

See also
Yangtze River bridges and tunnels

References

External links
Yudong run on both sides of the Yangtze River Bridge, a unique car, the middle of running light rail

Bridges in Chongqing
Bridges over the Yangtze River
Box girder bridges in China
Bridges completed in 2008